Jonava railway station is a Lithuanian Railways station in Jonava. The structure is included in the list of architectural monuments of Lithuania (code S 440). The station was built in 1871.

See also 
Jonava railway bridge
Jonava railway viaduct

References 

Railway stations in Lithuania
Railway
Transport in Jonava
Railway stations in the Russian Empire opened in 1871